Winston Churchill's pets are the various pet animals which were kept by Winston Churchill.

Churchill was an animal lover. He had pet cats and dogs such as his bulldog Dodo, poodle Rufus, wartime cat Nelson and marmalade cat, Jock.  He also kept a large variety of creatures on his estate, Chartwell, including butterflies, fish, cows, pigs and swans.

See also
 Canadian Parliamentary Cats
 Chief Mouser to the Cabinet Office, United Kingdom
 Hermitage cats in Saint Petersburg, Russia
 Pets of Vladimir Putin
 Tibs the Great
 Cats of the President of Taiwan
 United States presidential pets
 Pets of the British Royal Family
 Pets in the United Kingdom

References

Winston Churchill
Pets in the United Kingdom